The Players Tour Championship 2011/2012 – Event 7 (also known as the 2011 Kay Suzanne Memorial Trophy) was a professional minor-ranking snooker tournament that took place between 5–9 October 2011 at the South West Snooker Academy in Gloucester, England.

Ronnie O'Sullivan won the 47th professional title of his career by defeating Matthew Stevens 4–2 in the final. O'Sullivan also became the first player to win two PTC titles in the same season.

Prize fund and ranking points
The breakdown of prize money and ranking points of the event is shown below:

1 Only professional players can earn ranking points.

Main draw

Preliminary rounds

Round 1 
Best of 7 frames

Round 2 
Best of 7 frames

Main rounds

Top half

Section 1

Section 2

Section 3

Section 4

Bottom half

Section 5

Section 6

Section 7

Section 8

Finals

Century breaks 
Only from last 128 onwards. 

 141  David Gilbert
 140, 126, 103, 101, 101  Michael White
 137  Stuart Bingham
 137  Yu Delu
 137  Nigel Bond
 136, 115, 107, 104, 103  Ronnie O'Sullivan
 133  Aditya Mehta
 130, 100  Martin Gould
 130  John Higgins
 130, 124  Liang Wenbo
 127, 127, 119  Matthew Stevens
 127, 125  Li Yan
 124  Judd Trump
 123, 112  Stephen Hendry
 120  Lucky Vatnani

 117  Mark King
 115, 113  Mark Allen
 115  Mark Selby
 114  Mike Dunn
 113, 112, 105  Shaun Murphy
 112, 105  Michael Holt
 109  Andrew Higginson
 108  Dominic Dale
 104  David Morris
 103  Barry Hawkins
 103  Ben Harrison
 102, 101, 101  Liu Chuang
 100  Gerard Greene
 100  Andy Hicks

References 

2011
07
2011 in English sport
October 2011 sports events in the United Kingdom